The 2021 World Touring Car Cup was the fourth season of the World Touring Car Cup and 17th overall of the series, which dates back to the 2005 World Touring Car Championship. The season began on 5 June at the Nürburgring and ended on 28 November in Sochi.

Teams and drivers

Summary 
JAS Motorsport and Honda Racing retained their 2020 drivers – Attila Tassi, Tiago Monteiro, Néstor Girolami and Esteban Guerrieri – for the 2021 season. On 15 January it was announced that all four drivers would continue to compete for Münnich Motorsport and announced that Attila Tassi and Tiago Monteiro would join the ALL-INKL.DE Münnich Motorsport with Néstor Girolami and Esteban Guerrieri remaining at the ALL-INKL.COM Münnich Motorsport.

Comtoyou Racing switched from the running Audi RS 3 LMS TCR to the all-new facelifted Audi RS 3 LMS TCR (2021). Nathanaël Berthon, Gilles Magnus and Tom Coronel remained with Comtoyou Racing and Frédéric Vervisch returned to the series and the team after having last raced in 2019.

Cyan Racing committed to run four Lynk & Co 03 TCR cars for the season, Yann Ehrlacher and Yvan Muller were confirmed as drivers for Cyan Racing Lynk & Co and announced that Thed Björk and Santiago Urrutia were confirmed as drivers for Cyan Performance Lynk & Co.

Hyundai switched from the running Hyundai i30 N TCR to the all-new Hyundai Elantra N TCR. BRC Racing Team entered under the BRC Hyundai N Lukoil Squadra Corse banner with two former champions in Norbert Michelisz and Gabriele Tarquini, while Engstler Motorsport entered the remaining two Hyundai cars under the Engstler Hyundai N Liqui Moly Racing Team name for Luca Engstler and Jean-Karl Vernay, the latter having switched from Team Mulsanne to replace Nicky Catsburg. Target Competition joined full-time from the TCR Europe with Swedish siblings Andreas and Jessica Bäckman, who became the first woman to race in the championship. 2017 TCR Italy Touring Car Championship winner Nicola Baldan is also set to participate at selected rounds as a guest driver.

The Zengő Motorsport structure continued at the WTCR and expanded to four Cupra León Competición TCR cars, running under two distinct banners. Bence Boldizs and Mikel Azcona remained with the team, with series returnees Jordi Gené, who had last taken part in the series in 2010, when it was called the World Touring Car Championship, and 2012 World Touring Car Championship & 2020 STCC TCR Scandinavia Touring Car Championship winner Robert Huff, who came back after a year's absence, joining them at Zengő Motorsport Drivers’ Academy and Zengő Motorsport Services KFT respectively.

Calendar
The preliminary race calendar was published by the championship management on 13 November 2020. A change from previous years is that in 2021, for cost-cutting reasons, two races will be held on a weekend instead of three, and the series will return to the Asian continent after a year of omission. On 22 January 2021, the calendar was updated, postponing the Race of Hungary to 21–22 August and replacing the Race of Slovakia with the Race of Italy. On 10 May 2021, it was announced that the Race of Portugal would be held at the Circuito do Estoril instead of the Circuito Internacional de Vila Real. On 19 August 2021, three new rounds were announced as replacements for the races in the Far East.

Results

Championship standings
Scoring system

Scoring system for WTCR Trophy

Drivers' championship

Teams' championship

Juniors' championship

WTCR Trophy
Eligible for drivers racing without manufacturer support.

Notes

References

External links
 

2021 in motorsport
2021 in TCR Series
2021